Niphona albosignatipennis is a species of beetle in the family Cerambycidae found in Asia in countries such as Borneo, Sumatra and Malaysia.

albosignatipennis